Kitasatospora is an Actinobacteria genus in the family Streptomycetaceae. The genus name comes from Shibasaburo Kitasato, a Japanese bacteriologist.

Species 
Kitasatospora comprises the following genera:

 K. aburaviensis (Nishimura et al. 1957) Labeda et al. 2017
 K. acidiphila Kim et al. 2020
 K. albolonga (Tsukiura et al. 1964) Labeda et al. 2017
 K. arboriphila Groth et al. 2004
 K. atroaurantiaca (Nakagaito et al. 1993) Li et al. 2009
 K. aureofaciens (Duggar 1948) Labeda et al. 2017
 K. azatica corrig. (Nakagaito et al. 1993) Zhang et al. 1997
 K. cheerisanensis Chung et al. 1999
 K. cineracea Tajima et al. 2001
 K. cinereorecta (Terekhova and Preobrazhenskaya 1986) Labeda et al. 2017

 K. cystarginea corrig. Kusakabe and Isono 1992
 "K. fumigata" (Frommer 1959) Labeda et al. 2017
 K. gansuensis Groth et al. 2004
 K. griseola corrig. Takahashi et al. 1985
 K. herbaricolor (Kawato and Shinobu 1959) Labeda et al. 2017
 K. humi Klaysubun et al. 2022	validly published under the ICNP
 K. indigofera (Shinobu and Kawato 1960) Nouioui et al. 2018

 K. kazusensis corrig. Li et al. 2009
 K. kifunensis (Nakagaito et al. 1993) Groth et al. 2003
 K. mediocidica corrig. Labeda 1988
 K. misakiensis (Nakamura 1961) Labeda et al. 2017
 K. niigatensis Tajima et al. 2001
 K. nipponensis Groth et al. 2004
 "K. papulosa" corrig. Nakamura et al. 1989
 K. paracochleata corrig. (Nakagaito et al. 1993) Zhang et al. 1997
 K. paranensis Groth et al. 2004
 K. phosalacinea corrig. Takahashi et al. 1985

 K. purpeofusca (Yamaguchi and Saburi 1955) Labeda et al. 2017
 K. putterlickiae Groth et al. 2003
 "K. recifensis" Stamford et al. 2007
 K. saccharophila Li et al. 2009
 K. sampliensis Mayilraj et al. 2006
 K. setae corrig. Ōmura et al. 1983

 K. terrestris Groth et al. 2004
 "K. viridifaciens" Girard et al. 2014
 K. viridis Liu et al. 2005
 K. xanthocidica (Asahi et al. 1966) Nouioui et al. 2018

See also 
 List of bacterial genera named after personal names

References

External links 

Streptomycineae
Bacteria genera